"The Red One" is a short story by Jack London. It was first published in the October 1918 issue of The Cosmopolitan, two years after London's death. The story was reprinted in the same year by MacMillan, in a collection of London's stories of the same name.

Overview
The story is told from the perspective of a scientist called Bassett, who is on an expedition in the jungle of Guadalcanal to collect butterflies.
The "Red One" of the title refers to a giant red sphere, of apparently extraterrestrial origin, that the headhunting natives worship as their god and to which they make human sacrifices. Bassett becomes obsessed with the Red One, and in the end is sacrificed himself.

The story's theme was suggested to London by his friend George Sterling, to whom he wrote in 1916: 

There are parallels to Joseph Conrad's short novel Heart of Darkness. Critics have noted the possible influence of Carl Jung on the story, as London became aware of Jung's ideas at around the time of writing "The Red One" in 1916.

The story makes an enigmatic reference to helmeted figures, perhaps the Red One's alien crew. Here, London may have anticipated the ancient astronauts  of science fiction and pseudoscience. The science fiction writer Arthur C. Clarke  mentioned "The Red One" in a note to his 1983 short story collection The Sentinel:

The U.S. copyright on "The Red One" has expired, and the story is available on Project Gutenberg.

See also
 Flatland, a novel by Edwin Abbott Abbott
 Les Xipéhuz, a novel by J.-H. Rosny

References

External links

 

1918 short stories
Short stories by Jack London
Science fiction short stories
Works originally published in Cosmopolitan (magazine)
1918 short story collections
Solomon Islands in fiction
Guadalcanal
Ancient astronauts in fiction